In mathematics, the Borell–Brascamp–Lieb inequality is an integral inequality due to many different mathematicians but named after Christer Borell, Herm Jan Brascamp and Elliott Lieb.

The result was proved for p > 0 by Henstock and Macbeath in 1953. The case p = 0 is known as the Prékopa–Leindler inequality and was re-discovered by Brascamp and Lieb in 1976, when they proved the general version below; working independently, Borell had done the same in 1975. The nomenclature of "Borell–Brascamp–Lieb inequality" is due to Cordero-Erausquin, McCann and Schmuckenschläger, who in 2001 generalized the result to Riemannian manifolds such as the sphere and hyperbolic space.

Statement of the inequality in Rn

Let 0 < λ < 1, let −1 / n ≤ p ≤ +∞, and let f, g, h : Rn → [0, +∞) be integrable functions such that, for all x and y in Rn,

where

Then

(When p = −1 / n, the convention is to take p / (n p + 1) to be −∞; when p = +∞, it is taken to be 1 / n.)

References

 
 
 
 
 

Geometric inequalities
Integral geometry